In My Sleep is a 2010 suspense thriller film written, directed and produced by film director Allen Wolf.  It stars Philip Winchester, Lacey Chabert, Tim Draxl, Abigail Spencer and Kelly Overton.  It also features Kirsten Vangsness from Criminal Minds in a cameo role and Tony Hale from Veep in a cameo as well.  The story is about a massage therapist with chronic insomnia who fears he may have murdered a good friend while sleepwalking.

Plot 
Marcus (Philip Winchester) wakes up in a cemetery with no memory of how he got there. He suffers from parasomnia, a sleep disorder which causes him to do things while asleep which he cannot remember, and so is plagued with questions: "Where was I last night? Who was I with?"  Hoping to deal with his use of one-night stands to escape his problems, Marcus joins a Sexaholics Anonymous support group, where SA sponsor Derek (Michael Badalucco) helps him work through his problems.  His disorder takes a turn for the worse when he wakes up and finds himself covered in blood with a knife at his side and the police banging at his door. In a panic he hides the evidence and then learns from the police that Ann (Kelly Overton), wife of his best friend Justin (Tim Draxl), was found stabbed to death. Marcus is terrified to put together the pieces of how she might have been murdered. A series of mysterious phone calls make him believe that someone is watching him. Desperate to figure out what happens after he goes to sleep at night, he investigates his own nocturnal activities. His quest for the truth ends in a shocking revelation.

Cast

 Philip Winchester as Marcus
 Tim Draxl as Justin
 Lacey Chabert as Becky
 Kelly Overton as Ann
 Abigail Spencer as Gwen
 Beth Grant as Evelyn
 Michael Badalucco as Derek
 Tony Hale as Ben
 Kevin Kilner as Greg
 Amy Aquino as Detective Curwen
 Aidan Mitchell as Young Marcus
 Marcelle Larice as Carissa
 Allan Wasserman as Dr. Schwarz
 Alexandra Paul as Roxana
 Patrick Labyorteaux as Rob
 Bellamy Young as Olivia
 Kirsten Vangsness as Madge
 Shanna Collins as Jennifer
 Kevin Michael Curran as David
 Christopher Darga as Officer Etling
 Robert Joseph as Officer
 Larry Clarke as Officer Knachez
 Joe Nunez as Mr. Mather
 Vanessa Lee Evigan as Kelly
 Bunny Levine as Rachel
 Foro De Cine
 MovieWeb

Production notes
Allen Wolf wrote, directed and produced In My Sleep.  The film entered post production in August 2009, after having resolved several technical glitches before moving into sound design, music scoring and visual effects.  Sound design was handled by Hollywood's Jonathan Miller, whose works include Independence Day, Saw, Narc, Trainspotting, The Hills Have Eyes Part II, and many others, while music scoring was completed by Conrad Pope, who also orchestrated Indiana Jones and the Kingdom of the Crystal Skull, Horton Hears a Who! and Julie & Julia and The Curious Case of Benjamin Button, and who recorded the score in Bulgaria and Los Angeles.  Ralph Winter was the executive producer.  Alyssa Weisberg, who won an Emmy for casting Lost and also cast Star Trek, was the casting director.

Release

Premiere
On November 6, 2009, In My Sleep screened at the Fort Lauderdale Film Festival, where it won the Audience Choice Award.  The film has sold to over seventy countries around the world and has been translated into German, French and Spanish.

Box office
In My Sleep has gotten a limited release, screening in more than fifteen cities and still in theatrical release in 2011, earning as  much as $9,285 in one screening, becoming the #1 new indie movie of opening weekend in Los Angeles. As of July 2011 the film's total gross has come to $90,093.

Critical response
On Rotten Tomatoes the film has an approval rating of 13% based on reviews from 16 critics.  While critics conceded that the premise was interesting, they denounced the film as talky, dull, and technically shoddy. In a positive review, Duane Burges of The Hollywood Reporter wrote "A well-stirred titillation that will appeal to twentysomething audiences and movie-buff viewers who appreciate the pursued-pursuer, Hitchcockian style of suspenser. "In My Sleep" works because the protagonist, while flawed, is completely likable and honorable. Philip Winchester exudes an integrity, as well as a gritty determination, which makes us root for him. John Anderson wrote in Variety that it "boasts all the cerebral and aesthetic restraint of a West Hollywood dance club," and "Production values are dire, with too much lighting and not enough design."  In the Los Angeles Times, Gary Goldstein wrote "Writer-director Allen Wolf loads In My Sleep with so much psychosexual baggage you wish he just focused on one emotional affliction to propel this mediocre whodunit," and concludes "It's ultimately all too contrived and superficial to feel convincing, despite the story's often lurid appeal."

Awards
The film has won several festival awards:  "Audience Award" at Fort Lauderdale Film Festival, "Best Feature Film" at Omaha Film Festival, "Best Narrative Film" at the Las Vegas Film Festival, "Audience Award" at the Kansas City Film Festival, "Gold Kahuna Award" at Honolulu Festival and was a finalist for "Best Feature" at Kansas City Film Festival and the Orlando Film Festival.

References

External links 
 
 
 

2010 films
American thriller films
2010s English-language films
2010s American films